No Gold for Kalsaka is a 2019 Burkinabe documentary film written and directed by Michel K. Zongo and co-produced with Florian Schewe.

Production
The filming was done in the Yatenga Province of Burkina Faso. It was produced by Michel K. Zongo for Diam Production [bf] and Florian Schewe for Film Five GmbH.

Plot/Synopsis
Since a long time ago, in the African country of Burkina Faso, the  people of the small village of Kalsaka had mined and used gold for their economic sustenance. With the coming of a British multinational mining corporation, however, that was brought to a close as the people were zoned out completely of the mining benefits from their own land. The village commune, nevertheless, led by Jean-Baptiste, fights hard to take back what belongs to the locals.

Accolades
The film got a nomination for the Best Documentary category in the 2019 Africa Movie Academy Awards.

Reception
On November 15, 2019 in collaboration with the Montreal International Documentary Festival (RIDM), the film was premiered by Cinema Politica Concordia in Quebec. The film was billed as one of the films changing the world and was scheduled to be premiered in the Czech Republic in Autumn 2020 by One World.

Release
The film was released on February 24, 2019.

References

External links
No Gold for Kalsaka on IMDb
No Gold for Kalsaka on IDFA
No Gold for Kalsaka on DOC.fest
No Gold for Kalsaka on Bigsky Film Festival
No Gold for Kalsaka on HRFFB 2020

2019 documentary films
2010s French-language films
More-language films